Pristis amblodon is an extinct species of sawfish within the family Pristidae. It currently has two occurrences originating from New Jersey in both the Eocene and Miocene epoch. It was a nektobenthic species that lived in marine waters.

References 

amblodon
Fossil taxa described in 1869
Taxa named by Edward Drinker Cope
Prehistoric fish of North America
Fish described in 1869
Eocene fish of North America
Miocene fish of North America